Elenga is a town in Kalihati Upazila of Tangail District, Bangladesh.

Geography 
There is a river called Lowhajong is following near west side of Elenga Municipality.

Demographics
The total population of Elenga Municipality is 55000. Among them 26,950 are male and 28050 are female. Total voter number: 27,329
Man voter: 13,329
Woman voter: 14,000

Administration 

Shafi Khan was elected the first mayor of Elenga Municipality on 28 March 2013. Nur Alam Siddiqui was elected mayor on March 29, 2018.

Education
The education system of Elenga Municipality is more advanced. For doing study here there are primary schools, high schools, higher secondary schools and for technical study there are also institutions.
 Government Shamsul Hoque College, Elenga
 Lutfar Rahman Motin Mohila College, Rajabari
 Government Elenga High School, Elenga
 Jitendra Bala Girls High School, Elenga
 Elenga Govt. Primary School
 Rajabari Govt. Primary School

Notable residents

 Dr. Debapriya Bhattacharya - Specialist in economy, Research fellow of CPD
 Manna - Famous Actor, Producer

Points of interest 
 Elenga Resort
 Elenga Old Landlord House
 Fultala Ashrafia Jame Mosque 
 Bismilla Horti Culture, Fultala
 Temple of Rouha Sutradhar Para
 Rajabari LP Gas Field
 Elenga High School

References 

Populated places in Dhaka Division
Populated places in Tangail District
Pourashavas of Bangladesh